Suttons Wharf is a mixed-use development in Bethnal Green, east London. It was  historically a wharf on the Regent's Canal, south of the Cranbrook Estate and Roman Road.

References

Residential skyscrapers in London
Residential buildings completed in 2014
Skyscrapers in the London Borough of Tower Hamlets
Buildings and structures in the London Borough of Tower Hamlets
Bethnal Green